Yvette Baker (born 25 November 1991) is a competitor in synchronized swimming who represented Great Britain in the team event at the 2012 Olympics.  She also competed at two World Championships (2011 and 2013).

References 

1991 births
Living people
British synchronised swimmers
Olympic synchronised swimmers of Great Britain
Synchronized swimmers at the 2012 Summer Olympics
Sportspeople from Sutton Coldfield